Abū al-Qāsim, Abd Allāh ibn Muḥammad ibn 'Abd Allāh al-'Azīz al-Baghawī (829CE - 929CE) (kunya: Ibn Bint Munī') was a jurist in Baghdad.  Al-Marzubānī was his pupil.

Works
Among his books were:
Kitāb al-Mu’jam ‘Large Alphabetical Book’ ;
Kitāb al-Mu’jam aṣ-Saghīīr ‘Small Alphabetical Book’; 
Kitāb al-Musnad; 
Kitāb as-Sann ‘alā madhahib al-fiqha The Ordinances According to the Legal Systems of the Jurists.

Bibliography

See also
List of Arab scientists and scholars

Notes

References

829 births
929 deaths
10th-century jurists
10th-century writers
Scholars from the Abbasid Caliphate
Iraqi writers